Tiger, as a nickname, may refer to:

Artists and entertainers
 Tiger Haynes (1914–1994), American actor and musical performer
 Tiger Onitsuka (born 1998), Japanese jazz drummer
 Tiger Shroff (born 1990), Indian actor
 Tiger Varadachariar (1876–1950), Indian musician

Athletes
 Tiger Black (1918–1983), Australian rugby league player and commentator
 Tyger Campbell (born 2000), American basketball player
 Tiger Chen (born 1975), Chinese martial artist and actor
 Brent Crosswell (born 1950), Australian rules footballer
 Tiger Flowers (1895–1927), African-American middleweight boxing champion
 Tiger Jack Fox (1907–1954), American light heavyweight boxer
 Tiger Greene (born 1962), former National Football League player
 Tiger Lance (1940–2010), South African cricketer
 Nuno Lopes (footballer, born 1998), Portuguese footballer known as Tiger
 Tiger Mangweni (born 1980), South African rugby union player
 Dariusz Michalczewski (born 1968), Polish-German boxer
 Bill O'Reilly (cricketer) (1905–1992), Australian cricketer
 Mansoor Ali Khan Pataudi (1941–2011), Indian cricketer
 Ian Ridley (1934-2008), Australian rules footballer
 Jock Shaw (1912–2000), Scottish footballer
 Tiger Smalls (born 1969), former featherweight boxing champion
 Tiger Smith (1886–1979), English cricketer
 Tiger Stevenson (1907–?), English motorcycle speedway racer
 Tiger Williams (born 1954), Canadian former National Hockey League player
 Tiger Woods (born 1975), American golfer

Others
 William "Tiger" Dunlop (1792–1848), army and militia officer, surgeon, Canada Company official, author and politician
 Tiger Memon (born 1960), Indian gangster
 The Tiger, the nickname of a North Korean colonel who presided over the Tiger Death March during the Korean War

See also
 Georges Clemenceau (1841–1929), French Prime Minister, known as "Le Tigre" ("The Tiger")
 Tiger of Malaya, nickname of Tomoyuki Yamashita (1885-1946), Japanese general 
 Tiger of Malaya, nickname of Gerald Templer, British general

Lists of people by nickname